Natalia Kamilovna Ziganshina (born 24 December 1985), is a Russian former gymnast. She won a bronze medal in the team event at the 2004 Summer Olympics.

Personal life 
Ziganshina was born 24 December 1985 in Saint Petersburg. Her father is a Tatar. Her younger sister, Gulnara, also competed in gymnastics, appearing at the 2002 Junior European Championships in Patras.

Career 
Ziganshina was a member of Russia's gold-medal team at the 2000 Junior European Championships. She won the all-around silver and silver with the Russian team at the 2001 World Championships in Ghent, Belgium.

Ziganshina won gold on vault at the 2002 European Championships in Patras and silver on vault at the 2002 World Gymnastics Championships.

She did not compete at the 2003 World Championships in Anaheim but returned the next year. She won bronze in the team event at the 2004 Summer Olympics in Athens.

Competitive history

See also 

 List of Olympic female gymnasts for Russia

References 
 Profile on fig-gymnastics

1985 births
Living people
Gymnasts from Saint Petersburg
Russian female artistic gymnasts
Olympic gymnasts of Russia
Olympic bronze medalists for Russia
Olympic medalists in gymnastics
Medalists at the 2004 Summer Olympics
Gymnasts at the 2004 Summer Olympics
Medalists at the World Artistic Gymnastics Championships
Competitors at the 2001 Goodwill Games
Goodwill Games medalists in gymnastics
European champions in gymnastics
21st-century Russian women